Juan José Saer (Serodino, Santa Fe, Argentina, June 28, 1937Paris, France, June 11, 2005) was an Argentine writer, considered one of the most important in Latin American literature and in Spanish-language literature of the 20th century. He is considered the most important writer of Argentina after Jorge Luis Borges (according to Martin Kohan) and the best Argentine writer of the second half of the 20th century (according to Beatriz Sarlo). Four of his novels - La Pesquisa, El Entenado, La Grande and Glosa - appear on various lists made by Latin American and Spanish writers and critics of the best 100 books in the Spanish language of the last 25 years For his novel La Ocasión he won the Nadal Prize in 1987. In 1990, he won the Silver Condor Award for Best Original Screenplay for the film Las Veredas de Saturno.

Biography
Born to Syrian-Lebanese immigrants in Serodino, a small town in the Santa Fe Province, Saer studied law and philosophy at the National University of the Litoral, where he taught History of Cinematography. Thanks to a scholarship, he moved to Paris in 1968 where he taught at the University of Rennes. He had recently retired from his position as a lecturer at the University of Rennes, and had almost finished his final novel, La Grande (2005), which has since been published posthumously, along with a series of critical articles on Latin American and European writers, Trabajos (2006).

In the year 2012, a first installment of his previously unpublished working notebooks were edited and published as "Papeles de trabajo" by Seix Barral in Argentina. A second volume soon followed, which was the result of five years of editing work by a team coordinated by Julio Premat, who wrote the introduction of the first volume. These notebooks allow readers a privileged insight into the creative processes of Saer. As critics point out, the books of Juan José Saer may be taken as a single "oeuvre", set in his "La Zona", a fluvial region around the Argentinian city of Santa Fé, populated by characters who are developed and become referential from novel to novel.
 
Saer's novels frequently thematize the situation of the self-exiled writer through the figures of two twin brothers, one of whom remained in Argentina during the dictatorship, while the other, like Saer himself, moved to Paris; several of his novels trace their separate and intertwining fates, along with those of a host of other characters who alternate between foreground and background from work to work. Like several of his contemporaries (Ricardo Piglia, César Aira, Roberto Bolaño), Saer's work often builds on particular and highly codified genres, such as detective fiction (The Investigation), colonial encounters (The Witness), travelogues (El río sin orillas), or canonical modern writers (e.g. Proust, in La mayor and Joyce, in "Sombras sobre vidrio esmerilado").

Death and legacy
Suffering from lung cancer, he died in Paris on June 11, 2005, at the age of sixty-seven.  He was buried in the Père-Lachaise cemetery. 2021 At the time of his death he was writing the last chapters of his longest novel, La grande, which ended up appearing posthumously along with Works, a collection of literary articles that appeared in various newspapers and magazines that Saer already had ready for publication.

Film adaptations 

 Palo y hueso (Stick and Bone, 1968), directed by Nicolás Sarquís, with a script co-written with the author; based on the homonymous story.
 Nadie Nada Nunca (No, No, Never, 1998) directed by Raúl Beceyro; based on the homonymous novel.
 Cicatrices (Scars, 2001) directed by Patricio Coll; based on the homonymous novel.
 Tres de corazones (Three of Hearts, 2007) directed by Sergio Renán; based on the story The Taximetrist .
 Yarará (2015) directed by Santiago Sarquís; based on the story The path of the coast .
 El limonero real (The real lemon tree, 2016) directed by Gustavo Fontán; based on the homonymous novel.

Bibliography 

En la zona, 1957–1960 (1960)
Responso (1964)
La vuelta completa (1966)
Unidad de lugar (1967)
Cicatrices (1969)
El limonero real : novela (1974) 
La mayor (1976)
El arte de narrar : poemas, 1960/1975 (1977)
Nadie nada nunca (1980) 
El entenado (1983) 
Narraciones (1983) vol. 1  – vol. 2 
Glosa  (1986) 
Juan José Saer (1986) 
Una literatura sin atributos (1986)
El arte de narrar (1988) 
La ocasión (1988) 
The Witness translated by Margaret Jull Costa (1990) 
El río sin orillas : tratado imaginario (1991) 
Lo imborrable (1993) 
Nobody nothing never translated by Helen Lane (1993)  (pbk)
La pesquisa (1994) 
La selva espesa (1994) 
The event translated by Helen Lane (1995) 
El Concepto de ficción (1997) 
Las nubes (1997) 
La narración-objeto (1999) 
El arte de narrar : poemas (2000) 
Lugar (2000) 
Palo y hueso (2000) 
Cuentos completos, 1957–2000 (2001) 
La grande (2005) 
Trabajos (2005) 
 "Shadows on Jeweled Glass" translated by Jim Hicks (The Massachusetts Review 51.1, 2010)
The Sixty-Five Years of Washington (2010) Glosa, translated by Steve Dolph 
Scars (2011) Cicatrices, translated by Steve Dolph 
La Grande (2014) translated by Steve Dolph 
The One Before translated by Roanne Kantor (2015) 
The Clouds (2016) Las nubes translated by Hilary Vaughn Dobel 
The Regal Lemon Tree (2020) El limonero real : novela, translated by Sergio Waisman

References

External links
Biography:Guardian Unlimited
Biography: Argentine Literature (Spanish)
Biography: El Poder de la Palabra (Spanish)

1937 births
2005 deaths
People from Iriondo Department
National University of the Littoral alumni
Argentine people of Syrian descent
Argentine people of Lebanese descent
Academic staff of the National University of the Littoral
Academic staff of Rennes 2 University
Argentine male novelists
Argentine expatriates in France
20th-century Argentine novelists
20th-century Argentine male writers